The 1935 Northern Illinois State Evansmen football team represented Northern Illinois State Teachers College—now known as Northern Illinois University—as a member of the Illinois Intercollegiate Athletic Conference (IIAC) during the 1935 college football season. Led by seventh-year head coach Chick Evans, the Evansmen compiled an overall record of 7–1–1 with a mark of 5–1–1 in conference play, tying for third place in the IIAC. The team played home games at the 5,500-seat Glidden Field, located on the east end of campus, in DeKalb, Illinois.

Schedule

References

Northern Illinois State
Northern Illinois Huskies football seasons
Northern Illinois State Evansmen football